CADC could refer to:
United States Court of Appeals for the District of Columbia Circuit
District of Columbia Court of Appeals
Central Air Data Computer
 Certified Alcohol and Drug Counselor
 Canadian Astronomy Data Centre
 Chakma Autonomous District Council, India
 Comprehensive Area Development Corporation, India, West Bengal